David Alan Rosenberg (born 1948) is a military historian, and was Admiral Harry W. Hill Chair of Maritime Strategy at the National War College from 1996 to 2003 and held the Class of 1957 Distinguished Chair of Naval Heritage at the United States Naval Academy in 2015–2016.

Life
He graduated from American University, and from University of Chicago with an M.A., and Ph.D.  He taught at Temple University.

He has received scholar grants for research from the Harry S. Truman Library Institute (1974, 1975, 1983), the Lyndon Baines Johnson Foundation (1983, 1992), the Ford Foundation (1985, 1986). 
In 1995, he was appointed and elected Chair of the Secretary of the Navy's Advisory Subcommittee on Naval History.

Awards
 1980 Binkley-Stephanson Prize from the Organization of American Historians 
 1980 Bernath Article Prize from the Society for Historians of American Foreign Relations
 1988 MacArthur Fellows Program
 1995 Department of the United States Navy Meritorious Public Service Award from the Chief of Naval Operations
 2000 Department of the Navy Superior Civilian Service Award by the Chief of Naval Operations

Works
"The Origins of Overkill: Nuclear Weapons and American Strategy 1945 - 1960", International Security, 7 No. 4 Spring 1983
"Being "Red": The Challenge of Taking the Soviet Side in War Games at the Naval War College". Naval War College Review 41:81-93 Winter '88
"Pincher : campaign plans", America's plans for war against the Soviet Union, 1945-1950, New York : Garland Pub., 1989. 
"Admiral Arleigh Burke: Instinct", Joseph J Thomas, Ed., Leadership Embodied: The Secrets to Success of the Most Effective Navy and Marine Corps Leaders (Annapolis, MD: Naval Institute Press, 2005): 145–149.
The admirals' advantage: U.S. Navy operational intelligence in World War II and the Cold War, Authors	Christopher A. Ford, David Alan Rosenberg, Randy Carol Balano, Naval Institute Press, 2005,

References

External links
 "David Alan Rosenberg on: U.S. Planning for a Soviet Nuclear Attack", American Experience, PBS
 "Rosenberg, David Alan, 1948- ", SULAIR
 Profile at SourceWatch

1948 births
American naval historians
American University alumni
University of Chicago alumni
United States Naval Academy faculty
Naval War College faculty
Temple University faculty
MacArthur Fellows
Living people